Leylan (also Romanized as Leylān, Lailān, and Laylān) is a city in Leylan District of Malekan County, East Azerbaijan province, Iran. At the 2006 census, its population was 6,079 in 1,468 households. The following census in 2011 counted 6,175 people in 1,858 households. The latest census in 2016 showed a population of 6,356 people in 1,943 households.

The ancient Iranian town of Ganzak is identified as being near Leylan in the Miandoab plain.
Ganzak was built by the Achaemenids, and was the seat of the satrap of Media.

References 

Malekan County

Cities in East Azerbaijan Province

Populated places in East Azerbaijan Province

Populated places in Malekan County